Big Nambas (native name V'ənen Taut) is a Malayo-Polynesian language spoken by about  people in northwest Malekula, Vanuatu. Approximately nineteen villages in the Big Nambas region of the Malekula Interior use the language exclusively with no variation in dialect. It was studied in-depth over a period of about 10 years by missionary Dr. Greg. J. Fox, who published a grammar and dictionary in 1979.  A Big Nambas translation of the Bible has been completed recently by Andrew Fox.

Phonology
The consonant phonemes of Big Nambas are as shown in the following table:

  are aspirated  word finally.  is not noted as behaving likewise.
  are rounded  before the front vowels 
 The voiced fricatives  are devoiced  word initially and finally.

Big Nambas has a 5-vowel system with the following phonemes:

Big Nambas has a complex syllable structure with a large amount of consonant clusters possible. Additionally, clusters of up to four vowels are permitted (eg. nauei "water"). Stress in Big Nambas is phonemic, but partly predictable. The consonants /t β r l n/ all exhibit phonemic gemination when two identical ones occur between syllables. Linguolabial consonants are often marked with an apostrophe in the orthography to distinguish them from their bilabial counterparts.

Grammar

Big Nambas is a synthetic, head-marking language.

Nouns 
Nouns in Big Nambas are capable of phrasal expansion. There are three noun classes in Big Nambas:

 Obligatorily possessed nouns, most commonly constituent parts of any object (body parts, tree parts, ordinals, possessive)
 Optionally possessed nouns, with the subclasses:
 Nouns taking the third singular possessives nan or nen
 Nouns taking the prefix ar- "all"
 Title nouns (names and kinship terms)
 Unpossessed nouns (personal and interrogative pronouns)

Big Nambas features a system of complex nouns, formed by derivation. Derived nouns can be of one of five types: 

 Abstract nouns, formed by suffixing -ien to verb stems (eg. tkar "be pregnant" vs. tkar-ien "pregnancy")
 Articled nouns, formed by prefixing na- or n- to a verb stem beginning with a vowel (i-u "it rains" vs. n-u "(the) rain")
 Ordinal nouns, formed by prefixing the nominalizer ni- and suffixing the possessive -a (tl "three" vs. ni-tl-a "the third of")
 Determinative nouns, formed by prefixing ter- to some adjective stems (p'arei "long" vs. ter-p'arei "the long one")
 Reverential nouns, formed by suffixing -et to some nouns (nut "place" vs. nutet "a sacred place", cf. nap' "fire" vs. nep'et "sacred fire")

Nouns in Big Nambas may be compounded by following them with a verb stem.

References

Bibliography

External links
 V'enen Taut recordings
 Video about the language

Malekula languages
Languages of Vanuatu